Owain ap Dyfnwal may refer to:

Owain ap Dyfnwal (fl. 934), King of Strathclyde
Owain ap Dyfnwal (died 1015), possible King of Strathclyde